The 2012–13 Ligue 1 was the 75th season since its establishment. Montpellier were the defending champions. The league schedule was announced in April 2012 and the fixtures were determined on 30 May. The season began on 10 August and ended on 26 May 2013. A winter break was in effect from 24 December to 12 January 2013.

The season marked the 80th anniversary of professional football in France. In addition, German sportswear company Adidas became the official provider of match balls for the season after agreeing to a long-term partnership with the Ligue de Football Professionnel. To commemorate the 80th anniversary, adidas unveiled an exclusive ball, known as Le 80, for the new season.

Since France dropped from fifth to sixth place in the UEFA association coefficient rankings at the end of the 2011–12 season, the league's third place team, Lyon qualified for the third qualifying round of the 2013–14 UEFA Champions League, having previously been placed in the playoff round.

On 12 May, Paris Saint-Germain won the league title after a 1–0 away win against Lyon.

Teams 
There were three promoted teams from Ligue 2, replacing the three teams that were relegated from Ligue 1 following the 2011–12 season. A total of 20 teams competed in the league with three clubs suffering relegation to the second division, Ligue 2. All clubs that secured Ligue 1 status for the season were subject to approval by the DNCG before becoming eligible to participate.

Bastia became the first club to achieve promotion to Ligue 1. The club clinched the second division title on 1 May 2012 with three matches to spare after defeating Metz 3–0 at the Stade Armand Cesari. Bastia is making its return to the first division after a seven-year absence and is entering Ligue 1 on a run of two consecutive promotions. The club had earned promotion to Ligue 2 after winning the 2010–11 edition of the Championnat National.

Reims and Troyes became the second and third clubs, respectively, to earn promotion to Ligue 1 alongside the champions Bastia. Both clubs achieved promotion with one game to spare following league victories on 11 May 2012, which positioned each club in second and third place permanently. Reims, which is a six-time Ligue 1 champion, is returning to the first division after over 33 years playing in the lower divisions. During those 33 years, the club underwent liquidation and had all aspects of the club (its records, trophies, etc.) auctioned off. Troyes is returning to Ligue 1 after spending four years playing in Ligue 2. During its five-year spell outside the first division, Troyes also played in the Championnat National, the third level of French football.

Stadia and locations

Personnel and kits 
Note: Flags indicate national team as has been defined under FIFA eligibility rules. Players and managers may hold more than one non-FIFA nationality.

1Subject to change before the start of the season.

Managerial changes

League table

Results

Season statistics

Top goalscorers 

Source: Official Goalscorers' Standings

Hat-tricks

Scoring 
 First goal of the season: Souleymane Camara for Montpellier against Toulouse (10 August 2012)
 Fastest goal of the season: 27 seconds – Zlatan Ibrahimović for Paris Saint-Germain against Lille (2 September 2012)
 Latest goal of the season: 90+5 minutes – Ilan for Bastia against Reims (18 August 2012)
 Largest winning margin: 5 goals
 Valenciennes 6–1 Lorient (20 October 2012)
 Nice 5–0 Valenciennes (13 January 2013)
 Lille 5–0 Lorient (7 April 2013)
 Highest scoring game: 8 goals
 Lorient 4–4 Ajaccio (28 October 2012)
 Most goals scored in a match by a single team: 6 goals
 Valenciennes 6–1 Lorient (20 October 2012)
 Most goals scored in a match by a losing team: 3 goals
 Valenciennes 3–4 Bastia (30 March 2013)
 Toulouse 3–4 Nice (6 April 2013)

Clean sheets 
Most clean sheets: 23
 Paris Saint-Germain
Fewest clean sheets: 6
 Brest
 Nancy

Discipline 
 Most yellow cards (club): 83
 Bastia
 Most yellow cards (player): 14
 Sambou Yatabaré (Bastia)
 Most red cards (club): 10
 Paris Saint-Germain
 Rennes
 Most red cards (player): 2
 Younès Belhanda (Montpellier)
 Cheikh M'Bengue (Toulouse)
 Jamel Saihi (Montpellier)
 Florian Thauvin (Bastia)

Number of teams by region

List of 2012–13 transfers

References

External links 

 

Ligue 1 seasons
France
1